Ruth Benamaisia-Opia is a veteran Nigerian broadcaster. She was the anchor of NewsLine on Nigerian Television Authority. She was a one-time Commissioner for Information in Bayelsa State and also was a radio presenter with Radio Nigeria, Enugu.

Early life and career
Ruth was born in Lagos State to a diplomat father from Bayelsa State and an Ndokwa mother from Delta State. She lived her early life in Nairobi, Kenya and there, she watched presenters, newsreaders and that was where the passion and love for broadcasting came from.
She started her broadcasting career in 1977 in Enugu after her father asked her what she wanted to do and he introduced me to some people in broadcasting and she did some auditions. She started broadcasting straight out of secondary school with the NTA where she was casting the 9 o'clock news. She later became the anchor for NewsLine on same station by 9 o'clock every Sunday night. After she left the NTA, she worked in an oil company where she was the community relations manager.
She returned to broadcasting in 2016 with the Lagos Weekend Television. She was previously working with the Nigeria Television Authority (NTA) as a newscaster.

Personal life
Ruth is married to Prof Éric Opia, former OMPADEC Chairman. She is mother of Weruche Opia, British-Nigerian film and stage actress and entrepreneur.

References

Nigerian broadcasters
Living people
Year of birth missing (living people)